The Nandi Award for Best Female Dubbing Artist winners since 1997:

See also

 List of music awards honoring women

References

Music awards honoring women
Female Dubbing Artist
Voice acting awards